is a Japanese female rugby sevens player. She was named in Japan's women's sevens team to the 2016 Summer Olympics. She was also the captain of the squad.

Nakamura won silver at the 2014 Asian Games. She competed at the 2022 Rugby World Cup Sevens in Cape Town.

References

External links 
 
 

1988 births
Living people
People from Kanagawa Prefecture
Sportspeople from Kanagawa Prefecture
Olympic rugby sevens players of Japan
Japanese rugby sevens players
Rugby sevens players at the 2016 Summer Olympics
Rugby union players at the 2014 Asian Games
Rugby union players at the 2018 Asian Games
Asian Games gold medalists for Japan
Asian Games silver medalists for Japan
Asian Games medalists in rugby union
Medalists at the 2014 Asian Games
Medalists at the 2018 Asian Games
Japan international women's rugby sevens players
21st-century Japanese women